{{Infobox airport
| name = Daniel Z. Romualdez Airport
| nativename = {{small|Luparan Daniel Z. RomualdezPaliparang Daniel Z. Romualdez}}
| image = Daniel Z. Romualdez Airport (Tacloban, Leyte; 09-08-2022).jpg
| caption = Exterior of Daniel Z. Romualdez Airport as of 2022
| IATA = TAC
| ICAO = RPVA
| WMO = 98550
| type = Public
| owner-oper = Civil Aviation Authority of the Philippines
| city-served = Tacloban
| elevation-f = 10
| elevation-m = 3
| metric-elev = yes
| coordinates = 
| website = 
| pushpin_map = Philippines
| pushpin_map_caption = Location within the Philippines
| pushpin_label = TAC/RPVA
| r1-number = 18/36
| r1-length-f = 7,028
| r1-length-m = 2,142
| r1-surface = Asphalt
| metric-rwy = yes
| stat1-header = Passengers
| stat1-data = 1,489,803 186.97%
| stat-year = 2022
| footnotes = Source: CAAP
| stat2-header = Aircraft movements
| stat2-data = 23,468 79.31%
| stat3-header = Cargo (in kg)
| stat3-data = 5,374,654 17.51%
}}
Daniel Z. Romualdez Airport (Waray: Luparan Daniel Z. Romualdez'',), also known as Tacloban City Airport, is an airport serving the general area of Tacloban, a highly urbanized city in Leyte island in the Philippines. It is the main gateway from Manila and Cebu to Eastern Visayas. It is classified as a Class 1 principal (major domestic) airport by the Civil Aviation Authority of the Philippines, the agency responsible for the operations of all the airports in the Philippines excluding the major international airports. As of 2017, Daniel Z. Romualdez Airport is ranked as the eighth-busiest and the third-fastest growing airport by passenger volume out of the 45 commercial airports in the Philippines.

The airport is named after Daniel Z. Romualdez, a former speaker of the House of Representatives of the Philippines. It is one of two airports in the Philippines named after a member of the Romualdez family, the other being Imelda R. Marcos Airport in Mati after Imelda Romualdez-Marcos, the wife of the late president Ferdinand Marcos.

On November 8, 2013, the airport was largely destroyed due to the onslaught of Typhoon Haiyan. On January 17, 2015, the airport apron was the site of a large open-air mass held by Pope Francis that attracted nearly half a million pilgrims coming from all over the country to remember the effects of Typhoon Haiyan.

History

During World War II
First known as San Jose Airstrip, after the village where it is located, it was constructed as an airstrip for the US Air Force and a Seaplane base for the U.S. Navy by Seabees of the 88th Naval Construction Battalion at Leyte-Samar Naval Base Ca during World War II. USAF units based here included the 43d Bombardment Wing (15 November 1944 – 16 March 1945), 345th Bombardment Group (1 January – 13 February 1945), 417th Bombardment Group (6 December–22, 1944), 49th Fighter Group (24 October – 30 December 1944), 348th Fighter Group (16 November 1944 – 4 February 1945), 421st Night Fighter Squadron (25 October 1944 – 8 February 1945), and the 547th Night Fighter Squadron (9 November 1944 – 11 January 1945).

After World War II, when the airport was converted for use in commercial aviation, it became known popularly as Tacloban National Airport. The airport was given its current name in honor of Daniel Z. Romualdez, a representative from Leyte who became the 10th speaker of the Philippine House of Representatives. He was the uncle of Imelda Romualdez Marcos, the wife of president Ferdinand E. Marcos.

Devastation by Typhoon Haiyan and contemporary history
On November 7–8, 2013, Typhoon Haiyan roared through Tacloban and the Eastern Visayas Region. The airport terminal and the control tower were utterly demolished, and the airport was rendered unusable. The airport reopened on November 11 initially for turboprop aircraft, before reopening to A320 flights by November 14.

On January 17, 2015, the airport apron was the site of a large open air mass held by Pope Francis that attracted nearly half a million pilgrims coming from all over the country to remember the effects of Typhoon Haiyan.

Expansion works for the passenger terminal began in 2017 to address congestion in the airport. On March 16, 2018, the expanded passenger terminal was inaugurated.

Expansion and future development
In 1997, the Japan International Cooperation Agency (JICA) conducted a study which indicated the need for expansion of Daniel Z. Romualdez Airport, along with Legazpi Airport, Bacolod City Domestic Airport, and Mandurriao Airport in Iloilo City.

Part of the development project is the construction of the new terminal building. On September 15, 2020, House Majority Leader at the time Martin Romualdez unveiled the approved design of the terminal. The upgrades are ongoing to make the airport capable of handling international flights.

Structure

Passenger terminal
Daniel Z. Romualdez Airport has a single-level terminal building. The departure area has one boarding gate, scanners, and a souvenir counter. The arrival area consists of a single baggage carousel, and a porters' assistance desk.

In 2017, construction began on the expansion of the passenger terminal building which added  of floor area and additional 275 seats in the pre-departure area. The additional seats increased the pre-departure area capacity to 635 seats, enough to accommodate passengers for at least three simultaneous flights, compared to 360 prior to the construction. The check-in area was also expanded.

Runway
The airport has a single  runway running in a direction of 18°/36°.

Other structures
Other structures include a communications tower and an administrative building. The communications tower is located on the east end of the terminal building. It serves as the main communications facility of the airport. The administrative building houses the offices of airport staff and the Civil Aviation Authority of the Philippines.

Ground transportation
Access to the airport from central Tacloban is served by the jeepney services on the Downtown-San Jose-Airport route, from Marasbaras route, and the service from nearby Palo. In 2010, an airport taxi service was opened to shuttle passengers from the airport to the city's Central Bus Terminal, the city's commercial area and other destinations such as the San Juanico Bridge and the MacArthur Landing Memorial in Palo and to Tacloban's suburbs.

Airlines and destinations

Statistics

Data from Civil Aviation Authority of the Philippines (CAAP).

Accidents and incidents
All 70 passengers and five crew survived.
 On February 15, 2007, Philippine Airlines Flight 191 from Manila, performed by an Airbus A320, overshot the runway. There were no casualties among 113 passengers and six crew members. DZMM Correspondent Hector Go said the aircraft's front wheel ended up past the airstrip after the plane attempted to touch down in the middle of the runway around 7 a.m.
 On February 13, 2009, Cebu Pacific Flight 651 arriving from Manila, performed by an Airbus A319, suffered a bird strike upon landing at the airport, damaging the engine blades. Though the aircraft landed safely, its return flight was cancelled.
 On January 17, 2015, a Bombardier Global 5000 carrying Cabinet members Jojo Ochoa and Sonny Coloma, overshot the runway after it failed to take-off shortly after the Pope's plane took off. There were no casualties.
 On October 5, 2019, a Royal Australian Air Force Boeing C-17 Globemaster III was on its way to Edinburgh, Australia from Okinawa, Japan when it had an emergency landing at the airport at 12:48 p.m. after smoke was detected in the cockpit. The plane had eight crew members and 36 passengers. The aircraft departed for Australia two days later without further incident.

See also
List of airports in the Philippines
United States Army Air Forces in the South West Pacific Theatre

References

External links

Airports in the Philippines
Buildings and structures in Tacloban
Airfields of the United States Army Air Forces in the Philippines